The Durango shiner (Notropis aulidion) is an extinct species of freshwater fish of the family Cyprinidae. It was found only in Mexico. The Durango shiner was native to the Rio Tunal, which forms the headwaters of the San Pedro Mezquital River, a Pacific slope river rising near Durango City, Durango, Mexico (Chernoff and Miller
1986). It was taken there only in 1951 and 1961. Its closest relatives were the yellow shiner and the Ameca shiner.

References

Sources 
 

Notropis
Taxa named by Barry Chernoff
Taxa named by Robert Rush Miller
Fish described in 1986
Taxonomy articles created by Polbot